Olha Yuriivna Polyakova (born 17 January 1979) is a Ukrainian singer, TV presenter, and comedian known as Super Blonde.

Career
At 15, she began her singing career at Bakhus (Bacchus) restaurant on Kyivska Street in Vinnytsia.

In 2008, she released her eponymous song Super Blonde.

In 2012, she took part in the Ukrainian national competition for the Eurovision Song Contest.

Polyakova won several music awards in Ukraine, including the 2016 M1 Music award.

The Ukraine Minister of Culture had her sing for Viktor Yanukovych.

After Russia attacked Ukraine in 2014, she increased her concerts in Ukraine. While other Russian language singers left for Russia, she has stated that she does not want to go to Russia, not even to visit her mother who lives in Moscow.

In 2017 on season 4 of Tantsi z zirkamy which is Ukraine's Dancing with the Stars, she competed against nine others. The next year on season 5, she appeared as a guest host.

In February 2017, she hosted Kateryna Osadcha's Svitske Zhyttya or Svitske Life (“High Life”, svitsketv sometimes spelled Svetskaya Zhezn), a program on channel "1 + 1", during which she stated that Yuriy Horbunov helped her so that she could host Svitske Life. During the Corona virus pandemic in July 2020, she performed White Dance in a concert on the premiere episode of the 15th season of Svitske Life (“High Life”). In April 2021 on the show Svitske Life, Osadcha interviewed Polyakova while she and her family were vacationing in Turkey.

In February 2018, she was named the most beautiful woman of the year by Viva! Magazine.

In 2018, she founded the political party Blonde Party and is its chairperson. She stated that she wants to become president of Ukraine someday and would increase women's issues in Ukraine while president.

In September 2019, she and Andre Tan released a line of clothing called "Queen of the Night". She stated, “Tan is the most famous Ukrainian designer with the coolest management. He is the only fashion designer whose stores are located in almost every city. And if I want to sell my collection everywhere, then with whom, then, if not with him? We need to work with the best! ” When developing the collection Tan stated:
"I am always inspired by the virgins, who have a lot of fire and energy. Olya is a hurricane girl, a real tsunami. That's why, a couple of years ago, when I invited her to become the face of my new collection, I already knew that together we would create something explosive and now is the time. Agree, wearing a cap with a crown on your head is a challenge and at the same time our goal is for every girl who puts on our things to be a queen."

She is friends with Volodymyr Zelensky.

When asked "Superblondes are born or become?" Olya Polyakova replied, "This is a state of mind and, of course, a diagnosis from which every smart woman wants to recover. And I'm recovering quietly."

Polyakova continued touring Ukraine despite an ongoing Russian invasion of Ukraine. For instance she gave a concert in metro station Vokzalna in Dnipro on 27 January 2023.

Personal life
Polyakova is married to Vadym Polyakov, who is 15 years her senior. They have two daughters Maria (b. 2005) and Alice (b. 2011). Their home is Kyiv because that is where she has called her home the longest.

She was born in Vinnitsa, Ukrainian SSR, Soviet Union. At 3 months old, her 43 year old maternal grandmother began raising Olya Polyakova in Vinnitsa as if Olya was her third child while her mother attended medical school. Her maternal grandmother continued to care for Olya Polyakova while her mother and stepfather were traveling on business trips. Her maternal grandfather, a medical doctor, died when Olya Polyakova was six years old. She spent most of her childhood with her maternal grandmother in a house with chickens and a garden. She told her grandmother when she was seven that she wanted to start studying music and that Olya Polyakova would have to pay for music school which she attended the Vinnytsia School of Culture and Arts until graduating 9th grade. Her family wanted her to attend medical school but Olya went to music school in Kyiv, instead, attending Kyiv National University of Culture and Arts and Petro Tchaikovsky National Music Academy of Ukraine where she received a degree as an opera singer. When she was eight, she performed in several roles on Yeralash.

Her father, the son of a neurosurgeon, was a musician. Her father and her mother met while her mother was attending medical school where her paternal grandfather was a professor. All of her grandparents are doctors. Her paternal grandfather studied with Yuri Senkevich at the Military Medical Academy in Leningrad, Soviet Union.

Her mother (b. 1959), a pediatrician, has had a house in Vinnitsa since Olya was 15 year old but lives in Moscow and teaches at the diplomatic academy in Moscow after her return with her stepfather from Uruguay. After childhood, Olya Polyakova was much older when her mother married her stepfather. After her stepfather's death, her mother has dated a diplomat.

Her stepfather (b. 1949) was a senior diplomat posted to Hispanic countries (e.g. Spain and Latin America): Cuba as a consul of the Soviet Union for five years who established relations between the Soviet Union and Cuba, Mexico, and his last station was Uruguay before his death. Because her stepfather was good friends with not only Raul Castro and Pablo Escobar but also Fidel Castro, her godfather is fabled to be Fidel Castro.

Discography 

 Studio albums
 Приходи ко мне (2001)
 Шлёпали шлёпки (2017)
 Королева ночи (2019)

Singles
 2013: "#Шлёпки" (#Slippers)
 2013: "Russian Style" 
 2013: "Люли" (Lyuli)
 2013: "Мальчикам это нравится" (Boys like it)
 2014: "Асталависта, сепаратиста!" (Astalavista, seperatista!)
 2014: "Брошенный котёня" (Abandoned kitten)
 2015: "Любовь-морковь" (Love-carrot)
 2015: "Первое лето без него" (The first summer without him)
 2016: "О Боже, как больно!" (Oh God, how painful!)
 2016: "#Плавочки" (#Swimwear)
 2017: "Номер один" (Number one)
 2017: "Бывший" (Former)
 2018: "Мама" (Mama)
 2018: "Королева Ночи" (Queen of the Night)
 2018: "Любовница" (Mistress)
 2019: "Лёд тронулся" (The ice has broken)
 2019: "Звонила" (I called)
 2019: "Эй, секундочку" (Hey, wait a second)
 2019: "Ночная жрица" (Night priestess)
 2020: "Белый танец" (White dance)
 2021: "Взрослая девочка" (grown up girl)

Notes

References

1984 births
Living people
Musicians from Vinnytsia
Ukrainian women comedians
21st-century Ukrainian  women singers